The 1999 Championnat National 1 Final was the fourth final of the Algerian Championnat. The match took place on May 30, 1999, at Ahmed Zabana Stadium in Oran with kick-off at 15:00. MC Alger beat JS Kabylie 1-0 to win their six Algerian Championnat.

Championnat National

Group A

Group B

Championship final

Details

MATCH OFFICIALS 
Assistant referees:
 Herraz
 Brahim Djezzar
Fourth official:
 Djouder

MAN OF THE MATCH
 

MATCH RULES
 90 minutes.
 30 minutes of extra-time if necessary.
 Penalty shootout if scores still level.
 Seven named substitutes.
 Maximum of three substitutions.

References

External links
1998–99 Algerian Championnat National

Algerian Ligue Professionnelle 1 finals
1
Algeria